HD 23089 is a spectroscopic binary star in the northern constellation of Camelopardalis. Based on stellar parallax measurements made by Hipparcos, the system is about 800 ly (250 pc) away from the Sun.

The system consists of a cooler giant star and hotter main sequence companion. The pair orbit each other every 6,124 days, on an orbit that is relatively eccentric, at 0.678. Unpublished speckle observations suggest that the orbit is tilted towards the Earth's line of sight, and it has a relatively high inclination of about 87 degrees.

References

External links
 HR 1129
 Image HD 23089

Camelopardalis (constellation)
023089
Spectroscopic binaries
017587
G-type giants
B-type main-sequence stars
1129
Durchmusterung objects